Bursa granularis, common name the granular frog shell, is a species of medium-sized sea snail, a marine gastropod mollusk in the family Bursidae, the frog shells.

Distribution
This marine species occurs in the Indo-West Pacific, off New Zealand, in the Caribbean Sea, the Gulf of Mexico and the Lesser Antilles.

Description 
The maximum recorded shell length is 65 mm.

Habitat 
Minimum recorded depth is 0 m. Maximum recorded depth is 256 m.

References

 Dautzenberg, Ph. (1929). Contribution à l'étude de la faune de Madagascar: Mollusca marina testacea. Faune des colonies françaises, III (fasc. 4). Société d'Editions géographiques, maritimes et coloniales: Paris. 321-636, plates IV-VII pp.
 Spry, J.F. (1961). The sea shells of Dar es Salaam: Gastropods. Tanganyika Notes and Records 56
 MacNae, W. & M. Kalk (eds) (1958). A natural history of Inhaca Island, Mozambique. Witwatersrand Univ. Press, Johannesburg. I-iv, 163 pp.
 Drivas, J. & M. Jay (1988). Coquillages de La Réunion et de l'île Maurice.
 Michel, C. (1988). Marine molluscs of Mauritius. Editions de l'Ocean Indien. Stanley, Rose Hill. Mauritius
 Steyn, D.G. & Lussi, M. (1998) Marine Shells of South Africa. An Illustrated Collector’s Guide to Beached Shells. Ekogilde Publishers, Hartebeespoort, South Africa, ii + 264 pp. page(s): 72
 Branch, G.M. et al. (2002). Two Oceans. 5th impression. David Philip, Cate Town & Johannesburg
 Spencer, H.; Marshall. B. (2009). All Mollusca except Opisthobranchia. In: Gordon, D. (Ed.) (2009). New Zealand Inventory of Biodiversity. Volume One: Kingdom Animalia. 584 pp
 Rosenberg, G., F. Moretzsohn, and E. F. García. 2009. Gastropoda (Mollusca) of the Gulf of Mexico, Pp. 579–699 in Felder, D.L. and D.K. Camp (eds.), Gulf of Mexico–Origins, Waters, and Biota. Biodiversity. Texas A&M Press, College Station, Texas.

Bursidae
Gastropods described in 1798